Probability Theory and Related Fields is a peer-reviewed mathematics journal published by Springer.
Established in 1962, it was originally named Zeitschrift für Wahrscheinlichkeitstheorie und verwandte Gebiete, with the English replacing the German starting from volume 71 (1986). The journal publishes articles on probability.
The journal is indexed by Mathematical Reviews and Zentralblatt MATH.
Its 2019 MCQ was 2.29, and its 2019 impact factor was 2.125.

The current editors-in-chief  are Fabio Toninelli (Technical University of Vienna) and Bálint Tóth (University of Bristol and Alfréd Rényi Institute of Mathematics).

The journal CiteScore is 3.8 and its SCImago Journal Rank is 3.198, both from 2020. It is currently ranked 11th in the field of Probability & Statistics with Applications according to Google Scholar.

Past Editors-in-chief

1961-1971: 
Leopold Schmetterer (Vienna)

1971-1985:
Klaus Krickeberg (Bielefeld)

1985-1991: 
Hermann Rost (Heidelberg)

1991-1994: 
Olav Kallenberg (Auburn AL)

1994-2000:
Erwin Bolthausen (Zurich)

2000-2005: 
Geoffrey Grimmett (Cambridge)

2005-2010:
Jean-Francois Le Gall (Paris) and 
Jean Bertoin (Paris)

2010-2015: 
Gérard Ben Arous (New York) and 
Amir Dembo (Stanford)

2015-2020:
Michel Ledoux (Toulouse) and 
Fabio Martinelli (Rome)

2021-2024:
Fabio Toninelli (Vienna) and 
Bálint Tóth  (Budapest and Bristol)

References

External links

PTRF on Scimago

PTRF on Mathscinet

Probability journals
Publications established in 1962
English-language journals
Springer Science+Business Media academic journals
Monthly journals